Frane is a masculine Croatian given name and a variant of Franciscus. Notable people with the name include:

Frane Adam (born 1948), Slovenian sociologist, editor and former dissident political activist
Frane Bitunjac (born 1997), Croatian footballer
Frane Bućan (born 1965), Croatian footballer
Frane Bulić (1846–1934), Croatian priest, archeologist, and historian
Frane Čačić (born 1980), Croatian footballer
Frane Čirjak (born 1995), Croatian footballer
Frane Despotović (born 1982), Croatian futsal player
Frane Franić (1912–2007), Croatian Roman Catholic archbishop
Frane Ikić (born 1994), Croatian footballer
Frane Katalinić (1891–1976), Croatian rower
Frane Lojić (born 1985), Croatian footballer
Frane Matošić (1918–2007), Croatian footballer and coach
Frane Milčinski (1914–1988), Slovenian poet, satirist, humorist, comedian, actor, writer and director
Frane Nonković (born 1935), Croatian water polo player
Frane Petric or Franciscus Patricius (1529–1597), philosopher and scientist from the Republic of Venice
Frane Poparić (born 1959), Croatian footballer
Frane Selak (born 1929), Croatian music teacher famous for surviving seven brushes with death
Frane Šore Čelik (1918–1942), Croatian communist revolutionary
Frane Vinko Golem (1938–2007), Croatian diplomat and politician
Frane Vitaić (born 1982), Croatian footballer
Frane Vladislavić (born 1994), Croatian footballer
Frane Vojković (born 1996), Croatian footballer

See also
Fran (given name)
Frano (given name)
Franjo
Frain (disambiguation)
Franek
Franex
Franey
Frayne (disambiguation)
Ifrane

Croatian masculine given names